John Benjamin Kendrick (September 6, 1857 – November 3, 1933) was an American politician and cattleman who served as a United States senator from Wyoming and as the ninth Governor of Wyoming as a member of the Democratic Party.

Early life

John Benjamin Kendrick was born near Rusk, Texas to John Harvey Kendrick and Anna Maye on September 6, 1857. He grew up on his family's ranch and attended a public school in Florence, Texas until the seventh grade.

In March 1879 he was employed by Charles W. Wulfjen to move cattle from Texas to Wyoming. He arrived in the Wyoming Territory in August 1879 and settled on a ranch near Sheridan, where he raised cattle as a cowboy, ranch foreman, and later cattle company owner. In 1883 he returned to Texas and bought a cattle herd to establish his ranch in Wyoming. He married Eula Wulfjen on January 20, 1891. In 1895 he purchased the property in Nielsen Heights for his future home, and in 1908 began construction on the home, which came to be called Trails End. In 1970, Trails End was added to the National Register of Historic Places; in 1982 it was donated to the state of Wyoming for operation as a museum.

Kendrick worked as foreman for his father-in-law's cattle company from 1879 until 1883. He was employed by and invested into the Lance Creek Cattle Company and the Converse Cattle Company which he later became owner of in 1897. Kendrick became president of the First National Bank of Sheridan in 1900 and served until 1902.

Politics
In 1909 he moved to Sheridan and was elected President of the Wyoming Stock Growers Association. He was a member of the Wyoming State Senate from 1910 to 1914. In 1911 he was given the Democratic Senate nomination by acclamation by other Democratic members of the legislature, but was defeated by incumbent Senator Clarence D. Clark. He was given the nomination again in 1912, but was also defeated by Senator Francis E. Warren. He was a delegate to the Democratic National Convention from Wyoming in 1916 and 1924.

He then served as Governor of Wyoming from 1915 until he resigned in 1917, having been elected as a Democratic candidate to the United States Senate in 1916. Kendrick was reelected to the Senate in 1922 and 1928 and served from March 4, 1917, until his death at Sheridan, Wyoming, in 1933. In 1932 he received an honorary law degree from the University of Wyoming.

He was credited with beginning the investigations into the Teapot Dome scandal, a bribery incident that took place from 1922 until 1923, and was considered as a candidate in the 1924 and 1928 presidential elections. During the 1924 presidential election, Wyoming's six Democratic delegates were instructed to vote for Kendrick at the 1924 Democratic National Convention and did so for the first three ballots. During the 1928 presidential election, he was considered as a possible vice presidential nominee, but the nomination was later given to Senator Minority Leader Joseph Taylor Robinson at the convention.

He served as chairman of the Committee on Canadian Relations (Sixty-fifth Congress) and member of the Committee on Public Lands and Surveys (Seventy-third Congress). He introduced legislation that helped create the Grand Teton National Park in northwestern Wyoming.

Personal Life

His daughter Rosa Maye married army officer Hubert Reilly Harmon.

On November 2, 1933 Kendrick fell into a coma and was initially diagnosed with a cerebral hemorrhage, but they later determined that he suffered a uremia and died the next day. Governor Edwin C. Johnson praised him for his service as senator and Kendrick was interred in Mount Hope Cemetery in Sheridan, Wyoming. First Assistant Postmaster General Joseph C. O'Mahoney was appointed by Governor Leslie A. Miller to fill the vacancy created by Kendrick's death and won the Senate special election to fill out the rest of Kendrick's term in 1934.

Kendrick was inducted into the Hall of Great Westerners in the National Cowboy Hall of Fame in 1958.

Electoral history

See also
 List of United States Congress members who died in office (1900–49)

References

Further reading
 Georgen, Cynde. In the shadow of the Bighorns: A history of early Sheridan and the Goose Creek valley of northern Wyoming. Sheridan, Wyoming: Sheridan County Historical Society, 2010. 
 Georgen, Cynde A. One cowboy's dream: John B. Kendrick, his family, home, and ranching empire. 2nd edition, revised. Virginia Beach, Virginia: The Donning Company Publishers, 2004.

External links

 Bartlett, Ichabod S. (1918). History of Wyoming. Chicago, IL, The S.J. Clarke Publishing Company. History of Wyoming
 Peterson, C.S. (1915). Men of Wyoming. Denver, CO, C.S. Peterson Publisher. Men of Wyoming: The National Newspaper Reference Book of Wyoming Containing Photographs and Biographies of Over Three Hundred Men Residents
 Trail End State Historic Site (Kendrick Mansion)
 
 The Political Graveyard: John Benjamin Kendrick (1857–1933)
 Govtrack.us: Sen. John Kendrick
 National Governors Association
 John B. Kendrick Papers at the University of Wyoming - American Heritage Center

1857 births
1933 deaths
20th-century American politicians
Candidates in the 1924 United States presidential election
American cattlemen
Democratic Party United States senators from Wyoming
Democratic Party governors of Wyoming
People from Rusk, Texas
People from Sheridan, Wyoming
Democratic Party Wyoming state senators